My Little Bossings (also known as Torky and My Little Bossings) is a 2013 Filipino family-comedy film directed by Marlon Rivera, starring Vic Sotto, Kris Aquino, Ryzza Mae Dizon, and Bimby Yap. The film is an official entry for the 2013 Metro Manila Film Festival
which was released in theaters nationwide on December 25, 2013, by OctoArts Films, M-Zet Productions, APT Entertainment, and Kris Aquino Productions.

The film also marks Bimby Yap Jr.'s theatrical debut, and also the last film appearance of comedian Tado Jimenez, who died in a bus accident in Bontoc, Mountain Province on February 7, 2014, at the age of 39.

It previously held the title of being the highest-grossing Filipino film of all time until it was broken by Girl, Boy, Bakla, Tomboy.

In spite of negative reviews from critics owing to its extensive use of product placement, a sequel to the film was made, to which Sotto initially hinted in an interview, and was released in Christmas 2014 as one of the official entries for the 40th Metro Manila Film Festival.

Plot
Torky (Vic Sotto) is a bookkeeper working for Baba (Kris Aquino), a millionaire cash management specialist. Because of some conflict in her business that puts her life in danger, Baba entrusts the safety of her son Justin (Bimby Yap) to Torky, who takes him home to meet his daughter Ice (Aiza Seguerra) and Ching (Ryzza Mae Dizon), the street urchin that the latter took under her wing. Given that Justin and Torky are not particularly fond of each other, how all four of them would get along under one roof becomes the focus of the story.

Cast

Main cast
Vic Sotto as Victor "Torky" Villanueva
Kris Aquino as Barbara "Baba" Atienza
Ryzza Mae Dizon as Ching
Bimby Yap as Justin/Tintoy

Supporting cast
Jaclyn Jose as Marga Atienza
Aiza Seguerra as Ice
Jose Manalo as Parak
Paolo Ballesteros as Alat
Barbie Forteza as Rosy
Neil Coleta as Dino
Neil Ryan Sese as Jumbo
Erika Padilla as Leni
Lui Manansala as Sister Remy
Nico Antonio as Bodgie

Special participation
Gian Sotto as Police 1
Wahoo Sotto as Police 2
Jasper Visaya as Police 3
Pauleen Luna as Paleng
Roi Vinzon as Andy 
Tado Jimenez as Joker
Jimmy Santos as Barangay Captain
Joey de Leon as Agent Bryant (NBA/NBI)
Oyo Sotto as Agent Kobe (NBA/NBI)
Ruby Rodriguez as Janet Napulis
Andrei Palabay as Bimby's Friend

Critical reception
My Little Bossings was released to negative reception from critics, despite opening at first place in the box office.

Much of the criticism was directed at the film's plot and editing, citing lack of production value and its extensive and blatant use of product placement. The most negative reviews came from Rappler and ClickTheCity.com, each giving the film one out of five stars. Joseph Garcia of BusinessWorld branded the film as “one long commercial”, joking that the film is something to watch “if you’re looking to complete your grocery list and need a hint on what to buy.” Philbert Ortiz Dy of Click the City called the film “an insult”, criticizing the film's editing and also stating that it was “banking entirely on the presence of a couple of recognizable names.” A similarly critical review was made by Zig Marasigan of Rappler, also noting the intrusive use of product endorsements as “some of the most distasteful examples of local product placement while no effort is made to weave them into the narrative.” Television host Lourd de Veyra also stated his disappointment for the film in an open letter, lamenting that the film felt like it was “made in just three days”, and that “we never paid 220 pesos to watch the film for the actors to hawk instant pancit canton, bread, laundry detergent, cough syrup” and several other products endorsed by Kris Aquino and Vic Sotto.

A more positive review by Myra Grace Calulo of Philippine Entertainment Portal, however, saying that the film is “a family flick that sprinkled with gags and a lot of heart”, although she also noted the lack of character development and the story being “too drawn out at times”.

Sotto later addressed criticism of the film in a taped interview, stating “I’m open to all criticism, most especially if it's constructive. This is what we call democracy. I respect everyone's opinions. Just as how I respect the millions of viewers who were happy and amused at our film,” He later added, “What's important is it was a record-breaking festival.”

Box office
The film grossed  on opening day, setting the highest record ever attained by a Filipino movie of all time.

Awards

Sequel

Sotto initially hinted at a possible My Little Bossings sequel in a 2014 interview. While not much information has been released about the film at the tine, it was then later revealed that the sequel will be entitled My Bossing's Adventures and is a fantasy-adventure anthology film, with Sotto and Dizon reprising their roles. The film was released on December 25, 2014, as an official entry for the 2014 Metro Manila Film Festival.

See also
Mac and Me, a 1988 family film which received similar negative reception for extensive product placement
List of films considered the worst

References

External links
 Official website (archived)
 
 My Little Bossings channel on YouTube

2013 films
2010s children's comedy films
Philippine children's films
2010s Tagalog-language films
OctoArts Films films
APT Entertainment films
M-Zet Productions films
Sponsored films
2013 comedy films
2010s English-language films
Films directed by Marlon N. Rivera